6U  or 6-U may refer to:

IATA code for Air Ukraine
One of the possible sizes of a rack unit, 10.50-inches (266.70mm) nominal. See rack mount.
PW-6U, a model of  Politechnika Warszawska PW-6
RG-6/U coaxial cable; see RG-6
6U, a model of Zenit (satellite)
HY-6U, a model of  Xian H-6

See also
U6 (disambiguation)